Qaleh Sard-e Bala (also Romanized as Qalʿeh Sard-e Bālā; also known as Qalehsard-e Bālā) is a village in Dehdez Rural District, Dehdez District, Izeh County, Khuzestan Province, Iran. At the 2006 census, its population was 118, in 22 families.

References 

Populated places in Izeh County